CCR3 may refer to:

 CCR3 (gene)
 ICAO airport code of Florenceville Airport